John Marshall Jones is an American actor, best known for portraying Floyd Henderson on The WB sitcom Smart Guy. He is currently the spokesperson for Pizza Hut.

Career
Since 2021, Jones has had a recurring role as U.S. Air Force General Nelson Bradford in the Apple TV+ original science fiction space drama series For All Mankind.

Filmography

Film

Television

References

External links

African-American male actors
American male film actors
American male television actors
Living people
Male actors from Detroit
20th-century American male actors
21st-century American male actors
American male video game actors
20th-century African-American people
21st-century African-American people
Year of birth missing (living people)